Karadere  is a  village in Aydıncık district of Mersin Province, Turkey. The village is situated in the Taurus Mountains. The population of the Karadere was 220 as of 2012. The village was once a part of Yenikaş village at the Mediterranean Sea coast. Vegetable farming and animal breeding are the main economic activities of the village.

References

Villages in Aydıncık District (Mersin)